Polynovka is a rural locality (a village) in Balyklinsky Selsoviet, Fyodorovsky District, Bashkortostan, Russia. The population was 6 as of 2010. There is 1 street.

Geography 
Polynovka is located 19 km southeast of Fyodorovka (the district's administrative centre) by road. Balykly is the nearest rural locality.

References 

Rural localities in Fyodorovsky District